Karl August Leopold Böhm (28 August 1894 – 14 August 1981) was an Austrian conductor. He was best known for his performances of the music of Mozart, Wagner, and Richard Strauss.

Life and career

Education 
Karl Böhm was born in Graz. The son of a lawyer, he studied law and earned a doctorate in this subject before entering the music conservatory in his home town of Graz, Austria. He later enrolled at the Vienna Conservatory, where he studied under Eusebius Mandyczewski, a friend of Johannes Brahms.

Munich, Darmstadt, Hamburg 
In 1917, Böhm became a rehearsal assistant in his home town, making his debut as a conductor in Viktor Nessler's Der Trompeter von Säckingen in 1917. He became the assistant director of music in 1919, and the following year, the senior director. On the recommendation of Karl Muck, Bruno Walter engaged him at the Bavarian State Opera, Munich in 1921. An early assignment here was Mozart's Die Entführung aus dem Serail, with a cast which included Maria Ivogün, Paul Bender, and Richard Tauber. In 1927 he was appointed as chief musical director in Darmstadt. In 1931 he was appointed to the same post at the Hamburg State Opera, a position he held until 1934.

Vienna, Dresden, Salzburg 

In 1933, Böhm conducted in Vienna for the first time, in Tristan und Isolde by Wagner. He succeeded Fritz Busch, who had gone into exile, as head of Dresden's Semper Opera in 1934, a position he held until 1942. This was an important period for him, in which he conducted the first performances of works by Richard Strauss: Die schweigsame Frau (1935) and Daphne (1938), which is dedicated to him. He also conducted the first performances of Romeo und Julia (1940) and Die Zauberinsel (1942) by Heinrich Sutermeister, and Strauss's Horn Concerto No. 2 (1943).

Böhm first appeared at the Salzburg Festival in 1938, conducting Don Giovanni, and thereafter he became a permanent guest conductor. He secured a top post at the Vienna State Opera in 1943, eventually becoming music director. On the occasion of the 80th birthday of Richard Strauss, on 11 June 1944, he conducted the Vienna State Opera performance of Ariadne auf Naxos.

After World War II 
After he had completed a two-year post-war denazification ban, Böhm led Don Giovanni at La Scala, Milan (1948) and gave a guest performance in Paris with the Vienna State Opera company (1949). From 1950 to 1953 he directed the German season at the Teatro Colón in Buenos Aires, and he conducted the first performance in Spanish of Wozzeck by Alban Berg, translated for the occasion. In 1953 he was responsible for the first performance of Gottfried von Einem's work Der Prozess. From 1954 to 1956 he directed the Vienna State Opera at its reconstructed home. He additionally resumed ties post-war in Dresden, at the Staatskapelle.

Success in New York 
In 1957, Böhm made his debut with the Metropolitan Opera in New York, conducting Don Giovanni, and quickly became one of the favorite conductors of the Met's Rudolf Bing era, conducting 262 performances there, including the Met premieres of Wozzeck, Ariadne auf Naxos and Die Frau ohne Schatten, which was the first major success in the Met's new house at Lincoln Center. Böhm led many other major new productions in New York, such as Fidelio for the 1970 Beethoven bicentennial, Tristan und Isolde (including the Met debut performance of Birgit Nilsson in 1959), Lohengrin, Otello, Der Rosenkavalier, Salome, and Elektra. His repertoire there also included Le nozze di Figaro, Parsifal, Der fliegende Holländer, Die Walküre, and Die Meistersinger von Nürnberg.

Bayreuth and Wagner 
Böhm made his debut at the Bayreuth Festival in 1962 with Tristan and Isolde, which he conducted until 1970. In 1964, he led Wagner's Die Meistersinger von Nürnberg there, and from 1965 to 1967 the composer's Der Ring des Nibelungen cycle, which was the last production by Wieland Wagner. His Wagner conducting divided opinion; the recording producer John Culshaw wrote that Böhm's 1966 Walküre "was conducted with a stupefying indifference, as if the conductor could not wait to get back to Salzburg or wherever he was going for his next engagement”, but Grove's Dictionary of Music and Musicians praises Böhm 's Bayreuth performances for "finely display[ing] his qualities". The Times took a middle view, finding his Wagner "light and positive" but "somewhat reluctant to let the drama find its full weight and depth". Performances of the Ring and Tristan were recorded live and issued on record. In 1971 he conducted Wagner's The Flying Dutchman at Bayreuth.

Indian Summer in London 
Late in life, he began a guest-conducting relationship with the London Symphony Orchestra (LSO) in a 1973 appearance at the Salzburg Festival. Several recordings were made with the orchestra for Deutsche Grammophon. Böhm was given the title of LSO President, which he held until his death. He twice conducted at the Royal Opera House, Covent Garden in the 1970s: Le nozze di Figaro in 1977 and Così fan tutte in 1979.

Death, family, legacy 
Böhm died  in Salzburg, two weeks before his 87th birthday. He conducted the premieres of Strauss's late works Die schweigsame Frau (1935) and Daphne (1938), of which he is the dedicatee, recorded all the major operas (but often made cuts to the scores), and regularly revived Strauss's operas with strong casts during his tenures in Vienna and Dresden, as well as at the Salzburg Festival.

Böhm was praised for his rhythmically robust interpretations of the operas and symphonies of Mozart, and in the 1960s he was entrusted with recording all the Mozart symphonies with the Berlin Philharmonic.  His brisk, straightforward approach to Wagner won adherents, as did his readings of the symphonies of Brahms, Bruckner, and Schubert. His complete recordings of the Beethoven symphonies  with the Vienna Philharmonic in 1971 was also highly regarded. On a less common front, he championed and recorded Alban Berg's avant-garde operas Wozzeck and Lulu before they gained a foothold in the standard repertory. Böhm mentioned in the notes to his recordings of these works that he and Berg discussed the orchestrations, leading to changes in the score (as he had similarly done, previously, with Richard Strauss). He was described by one critic as one of the greatest conductors of the 20th century. Grove says of him:

He received two exclusive titles: "Ehrendirigent" of the Vienna Philharmonic and Austrian "Generalmusikdirektor". He was widely fêted on his 80th birthday ten years later; his colleague Herbert von Karajan presented him with a clock to mark that occasion.

Böhm was married to the soprano Thea Linhard. His son Karlheinz Böhm was a successful actor.

Nazi sympathies 
Although Böhm never joined the Nazi party, in public and in private he continually expressed strong support for Hitler and his regime. The extent to which this was a matter of conviction rather than careerism is uncertain and the subject of much speculation. Böhm's son maintained that his father was warned that if he defected from Nazi Germany, every member of his family would be sent to a concentration camp, but Böhm's support of the Nazis predated their rise to power.  The historian Michael H. Kater records that while Böhm was music director in Dresden (1934–43) he "poured forth rhetoric glorifying the Nazi regime and their cultural aims". Kater ranks Böhm in that group of artists in whom "we also find conflicting elements of resistance, accommodation, and service to the regime, so that in the end they cannot be definitively painted as either Nazis or non-Nazis." Kater also argues that Böhm's move to the Dresden Opera in 1934, where he replaced Fritz Busch after the latter's "politically motivated" dismissal by Nazi authorities, as evidence of Böhm's "extreme careerist opportunism at the expense of personal morality" and was facilitated directly by Hitler, who obtained an early release for Böhm from his previous contract. Kater contrasts this conduct with Böhm's "aesthetically faultless and sometimes politically daring" choice of repertory, and his collaborations with anti-Nazi directors and designers, which "could have been interpreted by enemies of the Nazi regime as a brave attempt to preserve the principle of artistic freedom". In 2015, the Salzburg Festival announced that it would affix a plaque in its Karl Böhm refreshment lobby (Karl-Böhm-Saal) acknowledging the conductor's complicity with Nazi Germany: "Böhm was a beneficiary of the Third Reich and used its system to advance his career. His ascent was facilitated by the expulsion of Jewish and politically out-of-favor colleagues".

Honours and awards
Böhm's awards include: 1943: War Merit Cross, 2nd class without swords (Kriegsverdienstkreuz II. Klasse ohne Schwerter); 1959: Grand Decoration of Honour in Silver for Services to the Republic of Austria; 1960: Grand Merit Cross of the Federal Republic of Germany (Großes Verdienstkreuz); 1964: Honorary Ring of Vienna; 1967: Berlin Art Prize; 1970: Austrian Cross of Honour for Science and Art; 1976: Commander of the Legion of Honour; Honorary Ring of Styria;  and 2012: Gramophone Magazine Hall of Fame

Notes and references

Notes

References

Further reading 

Böhm, Karl (1992). A Life Remembered: Memoirs. Translated by John Kehoe. London: Marion Boyars, 1992.
Endler, Franz (1981). Karl Böhm: ein Dirigentenleben. Hamburg: Hoffmann und Campe. Vorwort von Leonard Bernstein. .

External links 
 
 
 Rehearsing Don Giovanni

1894 births
1981 deaths
Musicians from Graz
Male conductors (music)
20th-century Austrian conductors (music)
20th-century Austrian male musicians
Austrian opera directors
Deutsche Grammophon artists
General Directors of the Vienna State Opera
Music directors of the Vienna State Opera
Militant League for German Culture members
Grammy Award winners
Austrian expatriates in Germany
Austrian people of German Bohemian descent
Commanders Crosses of the Order of Merit of the Federal Republic of Germany
Recipients of the Grand Decoration for Services to the Republic of Austria
Recipients of the Austrian Cross of Honour for Science and Art
Commandeurs of the Légion d'honneur